Wuhan University School of Law is the law school of Wuhan University in Wuhan, China.
The School of Law was oft-referred as one of the "Four Famous Law Schools" in China, and one of the "four departments and five colleges," representing the highest level of legal education in China. According to a 2009 evaluation conducted by the Chinese Ministry of Education, Wuhan Law was ranked the 3rd among the law schools in China, tied with Peking University. Both its undergraduate and graduate programs are ranked the 3rd in China by Wu Shulian.

History
In 1909, the law school was first established as the Wuchang University of Law. 
In 1926, the school was incorporated into Wuchang Zhongshan University, which later became National Wuhan University in 1928.
In 1949, Hankou Law School, a private institution, merged with the law department.
In 1958, Department of Law of Wuhan University was removed from the main campus and merged into Hubei University along with Zhongnan College of Finance, Zhongnan College of Law, and Zhongnan School of Politics and Law.
In 1979, Wuhan University reestablished its law department.
In 1986, Department of Law was renamed as School of Law.

Overview
Faculty
132 faculty members and staff
49 professors
30 associate professors
48 Doctors mentors
Students
2000+ graduate students
1000+ undergraduate students
Degrees granting
Doctor
Master
Post-doctor
Bachelor

Notable faculty and alumni
Wang Shijie
Zhou Gengsheng
Han Depei
Ma Kechang: one of the defense lawyers for Gang of Four after Cultural Revolution.
Mei Ju-ao：one of the judges in Tokyo Trial.
Wan Exiang: Vice President of the Supreme People's Court of China. He received his B.A degree from Wuhan University in 1980, LL.M. degree from Yale Law School in 1987 and LL.D. degree from Wuhan University School of Law in 1988.  After graduation, he joined the faculty of Wuhan University. Wan was elected as the vice president of the Intermediate People's Court of Wuhan in 1996, vice president of the High People's Court of Hubei in 1999, and Vice President of the Supreme People's Court of China in 2000.  He was elected as Vice President of the Revolutionary Committee of the Kuomintang in 2002.
Huang Jin: President of China University of Political Science and Law. He received LL.D. from Wuhan University School of Law, and was the dean of Wuhan Law until he left.
Karim Massimov: Prime Minister of Kazakhstan.

See also

References

Law schools in China
Wuhan University Faculty of Social Sciences
Educational institutions established in 1926
1926 establishments in China